Intel P2 may refer to:

 Intel Pentium II, a 6th generation Intel CPU design
 Intel 80286, a 2nd generation Intel processor design

πP2